Park Kwang-chun, also known as K.C. Park (born May 24, 1967) is a South Korean film director. He attended the film school at New York University and worked as an assistant director on Kang Je-gyu's The Gingko Bed (1996). Park directed the special effects-intensive fantasy blockbuster The Soul Guardians (1998), romance drama Madeleine (2003), comedies She's on Duty (2005) and Our School's E.T. (2008), and horror mystery Natural Burials (2012; before its theatrical release, it first aired as a 2-episode TV movie on cable channel MBN).

Filmography 
 The Gingko Bed  (1996) - assistant director, actor
 The Soul Guardians  (1998) - director, screenplay
 Madeleine (2003) - director, script editor
 She's on Duty (2005) - director, script editor
 Our School's E.T. (2008) - director, script editor
 Natural Burials  (2012) - director

References

External links 
 
 
 

Living people
South Korean film directors
1967 births